
Gmina Radzanowo is a rural gmina (administrative district) in Płock County, Masovian Voivodeship, in east-central Poland.

About 91% of the land in the commune is agricultural.

Villages
Gmina Radzanowo contains the villages and settlements of: Białkowo, Brochocin, Brochocinek, Chełstowo, Chomętowo, Ciółkówko, Ciółkowo, Czerniewo, Dźwierzno, Juryszewo, Kosino, Kostrogaj, Łoniewo, Męczenino, Nowe Boryszewo, Radzanowo, Radzanowo-Dębniki, Radzanowo-Lasocin, Rogozino, Ślepkowo Królewskie, Ślepkowo Szlacheckie, Śniegocin, Stare Boryszewo, Stróżewko, Szczytno, Trębin, Wodzymin, Wólka, Woźniki and Woźniki-Paklewy.

Neighbouring gminas
Gmina Radzanowo is bordered by the city of Płock and by the gminas of Bielsk, Bodzanów, Bulkowo, Słupno, Stara Biała and Staroźreby.

References

Radzanowo
Płock County